Cai Yong (132/133 – June 192), courtesy name Bojie, was Chinese astronomer, calligrapher, historian, mathematician, musician, politician, and writer of the Eastern Han dynasty. He was well-versed in calligraphy, music, mathematics and astronomy. One of his daughters, Cai Yan / Cai Wenji, was also a famous poet and musician.

Early life
Cai Yong was born in a substantial local family in Yu County, Chenliu Commandery, which is around present-day Qi County, Kaifeng, Henan. The Cai family had a reputation of not having their territory divided for three generations. When his father Cai Leng died, Cai Yong lived with his uncle Cai Zhi while taking great care for his own mother for her last three years. When she died, Cai Yong became known for his arrangement of his mother's tomb. After that, Cai Yong studied composition, mathematics, astronomy, pitch-pipes and music under Hu Guang, one of the highest-ranking officials in the Han imperial court.

Service under Emperor Ling
In the early 160s, Cai Yong was recommended to Emperor Huan ( 146–168) by the senior eunuchs for his skill with the drums and the guqin. On his way to the capital, Cai Yong feigned illness to return home to study in seclusion. Ten years later in the early 170s, Cai Yong served as a clerk under the official Qiao Xuan, who greatly admired his abilities. Afterwards, Cai Yong served as a county magistrate and then a Consultant in the capital, in charge of editing and collating the text in the library. Known for his literary skills, he was constantly commissioned to write eulogies, memorial inscriptions, and the like.

In 175, in fear of parties trying to alter the Confucian classics to support their views, Cai Yong and a group of scholars petitioned to have the Five Classics engraved in stone. Emperor Ling ( 168–189) approved, and the result was the Xiping Stone Classics, completed in 183, which set the canon for future generations of scholars.

Throughout his political career, he was an advocate of restoring ceremonial practices and often criticised against the eunuchs' influence in politics. He was successful in persuading the emperor to participate in a ritual in the winter of 177 through his memorials, but his attacks on the eunuchs were not so successful.

In the autumn of 178, the scholars were asked for advice on recent ill omens. Cai Yong responded with criticisms of eunuch pretensions. The eunuchs learnt of the attack, and accused Cai Yong and his uncle Cai Zhi of extortion. They were thrown into prison and sentenced to death, but the sentence was later remitted to exile in the northern frontiers. Nine months later, he cited to the throne that his work on the dynastic history and classics were at risk from enemy raids, and was allowed back to the capital. However, he offended the sibling of an influential eunuch during a farewell banquet before his return, which put his position in the capital at risk. Cai Yong fled south to Wu and Kuaiji commanderies and stayed there for 12 years.

Service under Dong Zhuo
When the warlord Dong Zhuo came to power in 189 and controlled the central government, he summoned Cai Yong back to the imperial capital Luoyang. At first Cai Yong was unwilling, but Dong Zhuo enforced his demand with the threat "I can eliminate whole clans", Cai Yong had no choice but to comply. Under Dong Zhuo, Cai Yong was appointed Left General of the Household, and became in charge of revising rituals for Dong Zhuo's new government. Despite Dong Zhuo's admiration of Cai Yong as a scholar and musician, Cai Yong worried about Dong Zhuo's temper and once considered to return home, but was persuaded that he was too well known to escape.

In May 192, when Dong Zhuo was killed in a plot by Wang Yun, Cai Yong was put into prison and sentenced to death for allegedly expressing grief at Dong Zhuo's death. Cai Yong and other government officials pleaded with Wang Yun to allow him to finish his work on the history of Han, but Wang Yun denied them, saying:  It was said that Wang Yun eventually regretted this decision, but Cai Yong had already died in prison. After his death, pictures were set up in his honour, and commemorative eulogies were composed throughout Chenliu Commandery and Yan Province.

Works
Due to the turmoil in China in the decade after Cai Yong's death, many of his works were lost. However, Cai Yong had apparently entrusted the bulk of his library to his protégé, Wang Can, and it is through Wang Can's collection that Cai Yong's works can be found in compilations like the Book of Later Han. A few of his works survive today.

His contributions include:
The editing of the Xiping Stone Classics
The compilation of Dongguan Hanji
Duduan on ceremonial
Cai Yong bencao on pharmacology
Nü Xun, advice for women
Qin Cao on playing the guqin
Zhuan shi on the aspects of the traditional seal script

Family
Grandfather: Cai Xi
Father: Cai Leng
Uncle: Cai Zhi
Children:
Cai Yan (Wenji), daughter
Daughter, personal name unknown, married to Yang Dao
Son, personal name unknown
Grandchildren:
Cai Xi, grandson
Yang Huiyu, maternal granddaughter
Yang Hu, maternal grandson

In fiction
Cai Bojie is the main protagonist in the 14th-century play Tale of the Pipa by Gao Ming.

See also
 Lists of people of the Three Kingdoms

References

 
 Chen, Shou (3rd century). Records of the Three Kingdoms (Sanguozhi).
 
 
 Fan, Ye (fifth century). Book of the Later Han (Houhanshu).
 Gong, Yi. "Cai Yong". Encyclopedia of China (Music and Dance Edition), 1st ed.
 
 Pei, Songzhi (5th century). Annotations to Records of the Three Kingdoms (Sanguozhi zhu).
 Zhong, Mingshan. "Cai Yong". Encyclopedia of China (Arts Edition), 1st ed.

132 births
192 deaths
2nd-century Chinese calligraphers
2nd-century Chinese historians
2nd-century Chinese people
2nd-century executions
2nd-century Chinese mathematicians
Ancient Chinese mathematicians
2nd-century Chinese astronomers
Artists from Henan
Dong Zhuo and associates
Executed Han dynasty people
Executed people from Henan
Guqin players
Han dynasty calligraphers
Han dynasty historians
Han dynasty musicians
Han dynasty politicians from Henan
Historians from Henan
Mathematicians from Henan
Musicians from Henan
People executed by the Han dynasty
Politicians from Kaifeng
Writers from Kaifeng
2nd-century Chinese musicians